Liu Chengbei (951–1016) was a Chinese government official of the Song Dynasty. His posthumous name is Zhongsu. His native place was in Shanyang.

He was the official in charge of the court treasury upon the ascension of Emperor Taizong in 976, and was charged with the task of standardizing the weights and measures. Because of its small size and precision, the  continued on for centuries as a tool for weighing precious metals and medicines.

References

Further reading
Guo Zhengzhong. "The Deng Steelyards of the Song Dynasty (960-1279): In Commemoration of the One Thousandth Anniversary of their Manufacture by Liu Chenggui," tr. Li Qinming and Hans Ulrich Vogel. In Jean-Claude Hocquet (ed.), Une activité universelle: Peser et mesurer à travers les âges (Acta Metrologiae IV, VIe Congres International de Metrologie Historique, Cahiers de Métrologie, Tomes 11–12, 1993–1994), pp. 297–306. Caen: Editions du Lys, 1994

951 births
1016 deaths
Song dynasty politicians from Shaanxi
Chinese inventors
Song dynasty eunuchs
Politicians from Shangluo